Stanley is a village in DeSoto Parish, Louisiana, United States. The population was 107 at the 2010 census, down from 145 in 2000. It is part of the Shreveport–Bossier City Metropolitan Statistical Area.

Geography
Stanley is located in western DeSoto Parish at  (31.963637, -93.903656). U.S. Route 84 passes through the center of the village, leading west  to Logansport and northeast  to Mansfield, the parish seat.

Demographics

As of the census of 2000, there were 145 people, 56 households, and 43 families residing in the village. The racial makeup of the village was 88.97% White, 10.34% African American, 0.69% from other races. Hispanic or Latino of any race were 1.38% of the population.

There were 56 households, out of which 33.9% had children under the age of 18 living with them, 60.7% were married couples living together, 14.3% had a female householder with no husband present, and 23.2% were non-families. 23.2% of all households were made up of individuals, and 12.5% had someone living alone who was 65 years of age or older. The average household size was 2.59 and the average family size was 3.02.

In the village, the population was spread out, with 28.3% under the age of 18, 6.2% from 18 to 24, 26.9% from 25 to 44, 19.3% from 45 to 64, and 19.3% who were 65 years of age or older. The median age was 36 years. For every 100 females, there were 85.9 males. For every 100 females age 18 and over, there were 82.5 males.

The median income for a household in the village was $31,477, and the median income for a family was $57,500. Males had a median income of $20,833 versus $13,500 for females. The per capita income for the village was $19,083. There were 19.4% of families and 22.2% of the population living below the poverty line, including 55.9% of under eighteens and 16.2% of those over 64.

References

Villages in Louisiana
Villages in DeSoto Parish, Louisiana
Villages in Shreveport – Bossier City metropolitan area